Tomasz Jacek Godoj (born 6 March 1978) is a Polish-German rock-pop singer and songwriter. He was the winner of the fifth season of Deutschland sucht den Superstar (2008), the German version of Pop Idol.

Early life
Godoj was born on 6 March 1978 in Rybnik, Poland to Danuta and Eugen Godoj. In 1988, along with his parents and his sister Hannah, he moved to Recklinghausen. Godoj then attended a secondary school and passed his specialty graduation examination for a career as a draftsman. He attended the Bochum University of Applied Sciences, specializing in civil engineering. During his studies, Godoj became interested in music and played with local bands such as Cure of Souls, Fluxkompensator, Tonk!, and WINK.

Deutschland sucht den Superstar

In the summer of 2007, Godoj auditioned in Berlin for the fifth season of Deutschland sucht den Superstar (DSDS). The judges enjoyed his rock style and attitude and voted him on to the next round, and later into the Top 15. In the first live show, Godoj performed "Chasing Cars" by Snow Patrol and received a standing ovation over multiple minutes while the jury gave him overwhelming praise. Week after week, Godoj performed for Germany until he reached the Top 2. He won the final contest with 62.2%.

Although Thomas was a front-runner from the start of the competition, he landed in the bottom groups twice during live result shows. After the voting results were published, however, it was shown that Godoj received the highest percentage of votes every week. This places him in DSDS history, along with Mark Medlock, as a contestant with the highest number of votes each week. Technically, this would also rank Godoj with Medlock and Alexander Klaws as the only winner never in the bottom 3, as he ranked the highest every week, but the bottom group was picked at complete random. He is the second "rocker" to win the competition alongside Tobias Regner.

After the DSDS show he got back together with his ex-girlfriend Jennifer. Their first daughter Lynn Jennifer Godoj was born on 3 January 2009.

Discography

Albums

Singles

Promo singles
2008: "Autopilot" (radio single with video; from the album Plan A)

Awards

2008
 Nickelodeon Kids' Choice Awards: Favorite Singer
 Journalia 2008 (award of Polish magazine Samo Życie)
 Jetix Awards: Newcomer of the Year 2008

2009
 18th Echo music awards: Best National Newcomer

External links

 Official website
 Thomas Godoj online forum

References

1978 births
Deutschland sucht den Superstar winners
Living people
People from Rybnik
People from Recklinghausen
21st-century German male singers
German rock singers
Polish rock singers
Polish emigrants to Germany
Naturalized citizens of Germany